Attila Hörbiger (21 April 1896 – 27 April 1987) was an Austrian stage and movie actor.

Life

Hörbiger was born in the Hungarian capital Budapest, then part of the Austro-Hungarian Empire, the son of engineer Hanns Hörbiger and the younger brother of actor Paul Hörbiger. In 1903 his family moved to Vienna, where his father set up a design office. Attila attended the Benedictine gymnasium at Saint Paul's Abbey, Carinthia from 1906 to 1914.

He began his stage career at the Wiener Neustadt municipal theatre in 1919, followed by engagements in Stuttgart and Bozen. In 1921 he performed at the Raimund Theater in Vienna and at the Lehartheater in Bad Ischl; his next engagements were at the municipal theatre in Reichenberg (Liberec), at the Vienna stage of Josef Jarno, at the German Reduta Theatre in Brünn (Brno), and at the New German Theatre in Prague. In 1928, Hörbiger joined the Theater in der Josefstadt ensemble under director Max Reinhardt; and from 1950 to 1975, he was a member of the Burgtheater. He acted Rudolf von Habsburg in Grillparzer's König Ottokars Glück und Ende at the great reopening of the Burgtheater on 15 October 1955.

From 1935 to 1937, and again from 1947 to 1951, he took the title role in the summer performances of Hofmannsthal's play Jedermann (Everyman) at the Salzburg Festival – according to Max Reinhardt the best actor ever in this role.

Hörbiger started his film career in the late 1920s. In 1931, he starred in Die große Liebe, the first film ever directed by Otto Preminger. He played in several German and Austrian movies, often alongside his second wife, Paula Wessely, whom he had married in 1935. With her, he had three actress daughters, Elisabeth Orth (b. 1936), Christiane Hörbiger (b. 1938), and Maresa Hörbiger (b. 1945). After the Austrian Anschluss to Nazi Germany, Hörbiger joined the NSDAP. He and Paula Wessely starred in the anti-Polish propaganda film Heimkehr ("Homecoming") of 1941, directed by Gustav Ucicky.

Still in 1974, Hörbiger premiered as Nathan the Wise at the Burgtheater; he appeared in theatre performances until 1985. Two years later he died in Vienna at the age of 91 following a stroke. He is buried at the Grinzing cemetery.

Films 

 Nachtlokal (1929)
 Ship of Girls (1929)
  The Deed of Andreas Harmer (1930)
  Das Wolgamädchen (1930)
 The Flute Concert of Sanssouci (1930)
 The Immortal Vagabond (1930)
 Die große Liebe (1931)
 Her Grace Commands (1931)
 The Emperor's Sweetheart (1931)
  Sehnsucht 202 (1932)
  Lumpenkavaliere (1932)
 The Tunnel (1933)
 Between Heaven and Earth (1934)
 Punks Arrives from America (1935)
 Variety (1935)
 Blood Brothers (1935)
 The Affairs of Maupassant (1935)
 Mädchenpensionat (1936)
 The Love of the Maharaja (1936)
 Harvest (1936)
 Premiere (1937)
 Revolutionshochzeit (1937)
 Mirror of Life (1938)
 Freight from Baltimore (1938)
  Zwischen Strom und Steppe (1938)
  Menschen vom Varieté (1939)
  Grenzfeuer (1939)
 Renate in the Quartet (1939)
 Woman in the River (1939)
  Donauschiffer (1940)
  Die letzte Runde (1940)
 Im Schatten des Berges (1940)
  Wetterleuchten um Barbara (1940)
 Heimkehr (1941)
 Late Love (1943)
 Die kluge Marianne (1943)
  Die goldene Fessel (1943)
  Am Ende der Welt (1944)
  Freunde (1944)
 The Immortal Face (1947)
 Gottes Engel sind überall (1948)
 The Angel with the Trumpet (1948)
 Maresi (1948)
 Ulli and Marei (1948)
 Vagabonds (1949)
 Cordula (1950)
 The Fourth Commandment (1950)
 Maria Theresa (1951)
 Captive Soul (1952)
 The Spendthrift (1953)
 The Witch (1954)
 Walking Back into the Past (1954)
 Espionage (1955)
 Das Mädchen vom Pfarrhof (1955)
 The Major and the Bulls (1955)
 Crown Prince Rudolph's Last Love (1955)
  Der Meineidbauer (1956)
 Kaiserjäger (1956)
  Der Edelweißkönig (1957)
  Man nennt es Amore (1961)
  Der Alpenkönig und der Menschenfeind (1965)
 Karl May (1974)
  Rückkehr (1977)

Decorations and awards
 1950: Kammerschauspieler
 1954: Merit Cross of the Federal Republic of Germany
 1959: Kainz Medal
 1961: Honorary Ring of the Vienna
 1966: Grillparzer ring
 1971: Honorary Member of the Burgtheater
 1971: Austrian Cross of Honour for Science and Art, 1st class
 1977: Grand Decoration of Honour in Gold for Services to the Republic of Austria
 1980: Nestroy Ring
 1985: Raymond Ring

External links

 
 
 Photographs and literature

1896 births
1987 deaths
Austrian male film actors
Nazi Party members
Male actors from Budapest
Hungarian people of Austrian descent
Austrian people of Hungarian descent
Officers Crosses of the Order of Merit of the Federal Republic of Germany
Recipients of the Austrian Cross of Honour for Science and Art, 1st class
Recipients of the Grand Decoration for Services to the Republic of Austria
20th-century Austrian male actors
Austrian male stage actors
Austrian Nazis